Georges Poujouly (20 January 1940 in Garches, Hauts-de-Seine – 28 October 2000 in Villejuif, Val-de-Marne) was a French actor who gained international acclaim as a child for his performance in the award-winning film Forbidden Games. In the 1950s, he appeared in a number of other high-profile films, notably Les Diaboliques, And God Created Woman and Ascenseur pour l'échafaud.  His later career was spent mainly in television, where he specialised in voiceover work.

1950s
At the age of 11, Poujouly was chosen by film director René Clément for the role of Michel Dollé, befriender of the orphaned Paulette (Brigitte Fossey), in the World War II drama Forbidden Games (Jeux interdits). The film was not greatly successful on its original release in France, but struck a chord with audiences and critics in other countries and went on to win numerous awards, including the 1952 Academy Award for Best Foreign Language Film. Forbidden Games is considered a classic of French cinema, and the spare, haunting performances of Poujouly and Fossey among the most notable of screen performances by child actors.

In 1952, Poujouly played the role of Michel le Guen in André Cayatte's We Are All Murderers (Nous sommes tous des assassins). In 1954, he played the main character in a famous audio recording of Le Petit Prince by Antoine de Saint-Exupery, alongside Gérard Philipe as the narrator.  He played smaller parts in Henri-Georges Clouzot's celebrated 1955 suspense film Les Diaboliques and Roger Vadim's And God Created Woman (Et dieu...créa la femme) in 1956.  A more substantial role, as a car thief turned killer, came in 1958 in the Louis Malle-directed thriller Ascenseur pour l'échafaud, with Jeanne Moreau and Maurice Ronet.

Later career
From the 1960s, Poujouly worked mainly in television, with film appearances limited to small roles in such as Vice and Virtue (1963) and Is Paris Burning? (Paris brûle-t-il?) (1966). He appeared in a number of TV serials and moved into voice acting.

Between 1959 and 1962 Poujouly was the voice of Tintin in two animated series based on Hergé's books. In later years his voiceover credits included the Michael Douglas character Steve Keller in the French TV version of The Streets of San Francisco and Merry in the 1978 animated version of The Lord of the Rings.

Death
Poujouly's last-known credit is Robinson et compagnie, a 1991 animated French language film version of Robinson Crusoe. Little is known of the last years of his life. He died of cancer, aged 60, on 28 October 2000.

Selected credits
Film

1952: Forbidden Games (dir. René Clément) - Michel Dollé
1952: We Are All Murderers (dir. André Cayatte) - Michel Le Guen
1952: La Jeune Folle (dir. Yves Allégret) - Un enfant
1952: Son dernier Noël (dir. Jacques Daniel-Norman) - Raphaël Fabrèze
1952: Quitte ou double (dir. Robert Vernay)
1953: Le Gang des pianos à bretelles (dir. Gilles A. de Turenne) - Jacky
1955: The Treasure of Bengal (dir. Gianni Vernuccio) - Tomby
1955: Les Diaboliques (dir. Henri-Georges Clouzot) - Soudieu, un élève
1955: Eighteen Hour Stopover (dir. René Jolivet) - Le gamin avec le capitaine
1955: Cortile - L'enfant de la rue (dir. Antonio Petrucci) - Ferdinando 'Nando' Rossi
1955: Il Piccolo Vetraio (dir. Giorgio Capitani) - Piero
1956: Si tous les gars du monde (dir. Christian-Jaque) - Benj - le mousse
1956: Les Assassins du dimanche (dir. Alex Joffé) - Julot
1956: And God Created Woman (dir. Roger Vadim) - Christian Tardieu
1957: The Ostrich Has Two Eggs (dir. Denys de La Patellière) - Roger Barjus
1958: Ascenseur pour l'échafaud (dir. Louis Malle) - Louis
1958: Guinguette (dir. Jean Delannoy) - François
1959: Pêcheur d'Islande (dir. Pierre Schoendoerffer) - Sylvestre Moan
1960: Une fille pour l'été (dir. Edouard Molinaro) - Michel
1960: Vacances en enfer (dir. Jean Kerchbron) - Jean
1961: Une grosse tête (dir. Claude de Givray) - Georges
1963: Vice and Virtue (dir. Roger Vadim) - Lieutenant Hoech
1966: Paris brûle-t-il? (dir. René Clément) - Landrieux (uncredited)
1970: Paix sur les champs (dir. Jacques Boigelot) - Louis
1970: Biribi (dir. Daniel Moosmann) - Sick Soldier
1972: Hellé (dir. Roger Vadim)
1981: Le Guépiot (dir. Joska Pilissy) - Le docteur
1991: Robinson et compagnie (dir. Jacques Colombat) - (voice) (final film role)

Television
1964: Les beaux yeux d'Agatha (TV serial) - Frédéric
1964: Le théâtre de la jeunesse (TV Movie)
1965: Frédéric le gardian - Fanet
1967: Par quatre chemins (TV Movie)
1974: La passagère - Patrick Larrivière
1975: Esprits de famille (TV Movie) - Victor Bichois

Voice

1954: Le Petit Prince
1959-62: Les aventures de Tintin
1972-80 (approx.): The Streets of San Francisco
1978: Le seigneur des anneaux (Lord of the Rings)
1991: Robinson et compagnie

References

1940 births
2000 deaths
People from Hauts-de-Seine
Deaths from cancer in France
French male child actors
French male voice actors
20th-century French male actors
French male film actors
French male television actors